Kentucky is the fifth studio album by American band Black Stone Cherry. It was released on April 1, 2016 through Mascot Records.

Track listing

Mastered by Ted Jensen at Sterling Sound, NYC

Charts

References

2016 albums
Black Stone Cherry albums
Mascot Records albums